Juan de Argüelles (1659 – January 23, 1712) was a Roman Catholic prelate who served as the Bishop of Arequipa (1711–1712) and the Bishop of Panamá (1699–1711).

Biography
Juan de Argüelles was born in Lima, Peru and ordained a priest in the Order of Saint Augustine. On May 18, 1699, he was appointed by the King of Spain and confirmed by Pope Innocent XII as Bishop of Panamá. In 1701, he was consecrated bishop by Pedro Díaz de Cienfuegos, Bishop of Trujillo. On March 21, 1711, he was appointed by the King of Spain and confirmed by Pope Clement XI as Bishop of Arequipa. He served as Bishop of Arequipa until his death on January 23, 1712.

While bishop, he was the principal Consecrator of Diego Morcillo Rubio de Suñón de Robledo, Bishop of Nicaragua.

See also
Catholic Church in Peru

References

External links and additional sources
 (for Chronology of Bishops) 
 (for Chronology of Bishops) 
 (for Chronology of Bishops) 
 (for Chronology of Bishops) 

1659 births
1712 deaths
Bishops appointed by Pope Clement XI
Bishops appointed by Pope Innocent XII
Augustinian bishops
17th-century Roman Catholic bishops in Panama
18th-century Roman Catholic bishops in Peru
Roman Catholic bishops of Panamá
Roman Catholic bishops of Arequipa